Reginald Engelbach (9 July 1888 – 26 February 1946) was an English Egyptologist and engineer. He is mainly known for his works in the Egyptian Museum of Cairo, above all the compilation of a register of artifacts belonging of the museum.

Biography 

Initially trained in engineering, in 1908 Engelbach had to discontinue his studies due to a long illness; in 1909-10 he went to convalesce in Egypt where he became fascinated by ancient Egyptian culture. In 1911 he started a collaboration with Sir Flinders Petrie as his assistant, excavating in various places such as Heliopolis, Riqqeh and Harageh. He later excavated in the Near East too.
In 1915 he get married and in 1920-21, after World War I, he resumed working with Petrie in his excavation at El-Lahun and Abu Gorab. He subsequently earned a remarkable number of charges and awards and began working at the Cairo Museum. His career, formed on both field and museum, culminated with the creation of the Register of the antiquities in the Cairo Museum. He died in Cairo on 26 February 1946.

Significant works 

 1946. Introduction to Egyptian Archaeology. With special references to the Egyptian Museum, Cairo (ed)
 1931. Index of Egyptian and Sudanese Sites from which the Cairo Museum contains Antiquities
 1930. Ancient Egyptian Masonry, with Somers Clarke
 1927. Gurob, with Guy Brunton
 1924. A Supplement to the Topographical Catalogue of the Private Tombs of Thebes, nos. 253-254. With some notes on the Necropolis from 1913 to 1924
 1923. Harageh, with Battiscombe Gunn
 1923. The problem of the Obelisks, from a study of the unfinished Obelisk at Aswan
 1922. The Aswân Obelisk, with some remarks on ancient engineering
 1915. Riqqeh and Memphis VI, with chapters by M.A. Murray, H. Petrie and W.M.F. Petrie

References 

1888 births
1946 deaths
People from Moretonhampstead
English Egyptologists
Egyptian Museum
20th-century British engineers
Artists' Rifles soldiers